The 1975–76 I liga was the 50th season of the Polish Football Championship and the 42nd season of the I liga, the top Polish professional league for association football clubs, since its establishment in 1927. The league was operated by the Polish Football Association (PZPN).

The champions were Stal Mielec, who won their 2nd Polish title.

Competition modus
The season started on 2 August 1975 and concluded on 2 June 1976 (autumn-spring league). The season was played as a round-robin tournament. The team at the top of the standings won the league title. A total of 16 teams participated, 14 of which competed in the league during the 1974–75 season, while the remaining two were promoted from the 1974–75 II liga. Each team played a total of 30 matches, half at home and half away, two games against each other team. Teams received two points for a win and one point for a draw.

League table

Results

Top goalscorers

References

Bibliography

External links
 Poland – List of final tables at RSSSF 
 List of Polish football championships 
 History of the Polish League 
 List of Polish football championships 

Ekstraklasa seasons
1975–76 in Polish football
Pol